Lenos is the name of a city of Pisatis in ancient Elis. Phlegon of Tralles mentions that Lenos had a victor at Olympiad XLVIII of the Ancient Olympic Games (588 BCE). The site of Lenos is unlocated.

References

Populated places in ancient Elis
Former populated places in Greece
Lost ancient cities and towns